RAPD may refer to:
Relative afferent pupillary defect
Random amplification of polymorphic DNA